The Australia Cup, formerly known as the FFA Cup until the 2021 season, is the national soccer knockout cup competition in Australia. This annual competition is organised by Football Australia, formerly known as Football Federation Australia until 2020.

The Australia Cup comprises teams from the top division, A-League Men (known as simply the A-League before the 2021–22 season), as well as those from lower tiers in the Australian soccer league system. Teams enter in progressive stages, with qualifying rounds culminating with the competition proper, starting with the Round of 32. Each state and territory-based member federation is granted a team allocation for entry into the main competition, joining clubs from A-League Men. Initially, all A-League Men's teams entered at the Round of 32; following the latest expansion of the league, the top eight teams enter at the Round of 32, while play-offs are conducted between the four lowest-ranked teams for the final two qualification slots.

From 2021 onwards, the winner of the competition also qualifies for one of the play-off spots for the following year's AFC club competitions. This is the 2022 AFC Champions League for 2022, and will be the AFC Cup in the 2023–24 year,  unless Wellington Phoenix are the winner.

Since the Australian soccer league system provides no promotion and relegation mechanism between the first and lower divisions, part of the competition's appeal stems from the fact that it is the only way that A-League Men and lower-tier clubs can play formal competitive matches.

Adelaide United are the most successful team with three titles. Macarthur FC are the defending champions after defeating Sydney United 58 in the 2022 final.

History

Australia has a long history of regional and state-based knockout cup competitions. However, a sustainable national knockout cup competition that encompassed clubs on all levels of Australian league system has been hard to realise. Prior to the FFA Cup, the first and only Australian national knockout tournament was the Australia Cup. It was founded in 1962 but was abolished in 1968 after just seven seasons of competition. In 1977 a knockout competition called the NSL Cup was founded, which ran in parallel with the former National Soccer League (NSL). This competition involved Australian soccer clubs competing in the then top-flight NSL, plus a limited number of clubs from state-based competitions.  The NSL Cup ceased after the 1996–97 tournament.  An A-League Pre-Season Challenge Cup competition ran between 2005 and 2008 but involved only the teams from the A-League Men and was not in a traditional knockout format.

The FFA Cup was previously scheduled to commence in 2013, though after suffering numerous delays due to FFA's 2012 television coverage deal and rising cost concerns the competition was put on hold. On 29 August 2013, it was announced that a national FFA Cup would commence in 2014, after what would be two years of organising the knock out competition. On 14 October 2013, FFA announced that it had appointed Sam Chadwick as General Manager of the FFA Cup. On 24 February 2014, the FFA Cup was formally launched by David Gallop.

The first member federation club to qualify for the FFA Cup was Tuggeranong United from the Australian Capital Territory. Tuggeranong United qualified for the 2014 FFA Cup as the winners of the 2013 ACT Federation Cup.  The first games in the tournament proper occurred on 29 July 2014, with four games from the Round of 32 played concurrently. In 2014 former three time NSL Champions Adelaide City became the first semi-professional state-league club to defeat a professional A-League club, defeating Western Sydney Wanderers 1–0.

In late 2020 the FFA announced that future winners of the cup would earn an Asian Champions League preliminary round spot; however, by 2022 the winner would now qualify for the AFC Cup instead.

The 2020 competition was cancelled on 3 July 2020 due to the COVID-19 pandemic in Australia. This on-going pandemic caused further disruptions to both the preliminary rounds and the main competition in 2021.

In 2022 Sydney United 58 became the first National Premier Leagues club to reach the final of the Australia Cup, defeating A-League Men's club Brisbane Roar in the semi-final.

Eligibility 

Up to and including the 2019 edition, the 32 teams that make up the Australia Cup competition proper have been the 10 A-League teams with the remaining 22 teams composed of various semi-professional and amateur qualifiers, referred to as "Member Federation Clubs", from each of the state federations, with the A-League clubs enter the competition at the Round of 32. For the 2021 edition, the top eight placed A-League clubs for the 2020–21 A-League season gain automatic qualification to the Round of 32. The remaining four teams are subject to a play-off series for the remaining two positions.

The number of clubs representing each federation is determined by player registration numbers in each jurisdiction, and reviewed annually. The Northern Territory did not participate in the inaugural competition, however have been represented since 2015.

From the 2015 edition of the competition onwards the National Premier Leagues Champion of the previous year, also qualifies for the FFA Cup Round of 32. The first club to qualify via this method was North Eastern MetroStars from South Australia who won the 2014 National Premier Leagues Finals Series. For the 2022 edition, as there was no NPL Champion in the previous year, an additional slot was allocated to Victoria.

Competition format
The competition proper is a 32-team knockout tournament. In the event of a match being drawn after the completion of 90 minutes, extra time is played, followed by a penalty shoot-out if required. In some preliminary rounds, games can go straight to penalties if tied at 90 minutes.

Up until the 2019 edition, all A-League teams entered at the Round of 32. From 2021, only the top eight placed A-League Men clubs for the previous season gain automatic qualification, with the remaining four teams subject to a play-off series for the remaining two positions.

From 2022 an open draw for each round is made from the Round of 32 to the Semi-Finals, with home ground preference given to Member Federation Clubs where they are drawn against A-League opposition. In 2021 there was a restricted draw for the Round of 32 and Round of 16, split into different geographic zones to minimise travel requirements. In prior years, the draw was made to ensure that there would be some progression of Member Federation Clubs to later rounds, including one Member Federation club guaranteed to make the Semi Final. Wellington Phoenix have additional restrictions imposed as they are a New Zealand-based team, and must play all of their matches in Australia, away from home.

Final
The inaugural 2014 FFA Cup Final was held as a mid-week fixture on Tuesday 16 December 2014, in order to minimise the impact on the scheduling of the 2014–15 A-League season, already disrupted by Australia hosting the 2015 AFC Asian Cup. For the following year, the 2015 FFA Cup Final was played on a weekend date free of other 2015–16 A-League games, to "emphasise the importance of the Final". From 2016 to 2019, the Final was staged as a mid-week fixture.

Trophy
At the end of the final, the winning team is presented with a trophy, known as the "FFA Cup Trophy", which they will hold until the following year's final.

The trophy is a large traditional style cup with an intentional resemblance to the historical Australia Cup trophy which ran from 1962 to 1968. The cup itself is made from silver-soldered brass, which is plated with 24 carat gold and sterling silver. It has two handles which each have the badge of Football Federation Australia inscribed on the inside corners. Also inscribed on the cup is the design of the cup and the words FFA Cup. The trophy features two soccer balls, one as the base of the cup and the other as a trim, on the very top of the cup lid.

The FFA Cup Trophy was created by D3 Design, who also designed the A-League, W-League and NPL Champions silverware.

Sponsorship
In its inaugural season the FFA Cup joined with an official naming rights partner. In 2014, Westfield Group was announced as the sponsor for the first three seasons of the cup tournament, known for commercial purposes as the "Westfield FFA Cup".

Between 2014 and 2016 Umbro supplied match balls for all FFA Cup matches. The FFA Cup Match Ball, the Umbro Neo 150 Elite, was specially designed for the competition. Between 2017 and 2019 Mitre supplied the Mitre Delta Hyperseam as the official FFA Cup match ball after a public vote to select between three alternate ball designs. After the cancellation of the 2020 competition, Mitre introduced the Mitre Delta Max for the 2021 FFA Cup.

Records and statistics

Team records

Final
Most wins: 3, Adelaide United (2014, 2018, 2019).
Most consecutive wins: 2, Adelaide United (2018, 2019).
Most appearances in the final: 4, Adelaide United (2014, 2017, 2018, 2019).
Most consecutive appearances in the final: 3, Adelaide United (2017, 2018, 2019) and Sydney FC (2016, 2017, 2018).
Biggest win: 4 goals: Adelaide United 4–0 Melbourne City (2019).

All rounds

Round of 32 onwards
Biggest win: Darwin Rovers 0–8 Sydney FC (Round of 32, 2 August 2017).
Biggest home win: Lions FC 6–0 Casuarina FC (Round of 32, 21 September 2021)
Most clubs competing in a season: 781, (2018)
Highest scoring: 9,
 Hills Brumbies 3–6 (a.e.t.) Hakoah Sydney City East (Round of 32, 26 July 2017).
 Sydney United 58 7–2 Far North Queensland (Round of 32, 9 August 2017).
Highest attendance: 18,751, Melbourne City v. Sydney FC, (2016 FFA Cup Final, 30 November 2016).
Lowest attendance: 327, Bonnyrigg White Eagles v. Manly United (Round of 32, 3 August 2016).

Preliminary rounds
Biggest win and highest scoring: 31,
Teviot Downs 0–31 Bayside United, (Second Round, 2 March 2019).
Albion Park White Eagles 31–0 Epping FC, (Second Round, 14 March 2020).

Individual records

Final
Most wins by a player: 3, 
Michael Jakobsen (Melbourne City) (2016) & (Adelaide United) (2018, 2019).
Michael Marrone (Adelaide United) (2014, 2018, 2019).
Most appearances: 4, Michael Marrone (Adelaide United) (2014, 2017, 2018, 2019).
Youngest goalscorer in a final: 19 years and 148 days, Al Hassan Toure (for Adelaide United v. Melbourne City, Final, 23 October 2019).

Round of 32 onwards
Most career goals: 12, Besart Berisha (Melbourne Victory, between 2014 and 2017).
Most goals in a season: 8, Bobô (Sydney FC, 2017).
Most goals in a game: 4
 Matt Sim (for Central Coast Mariners v. Palm Beach Sharks, Quarter-finals, 14 October 2014).
 Bobô (for Sydney FC v. Darwin Rovers, Round of 32, 2 August 2017).
Fastest goal: 26 seconds, Daniel Heffernan (for Heidelberg United v. Sydney United 58, Round of 16, 26 August 2015).
Fastest hat-trick: 18 minutes, Matt Sim (for Central Coast Mariners v. Palm Beach Sharks, Quarter-finals, 14 October 2014).
Youngest goalscorer: 16 years and 260 days, Alex Badolato (for Western Sydney Wanderers v. Broadmeadow Magic, Round of 32, 10 November 2021).
Youngest player: 13 years and 243 days, Ymer Abili (for Oakleigh Cannons v. Macarthur FC, Semi-finals, 14 September 2022).

Preliminary rounds
Fastest goal: 11.2 seconds, Shaun Robinson (for Nerang Soccer Club v. Bribie Island Tigers FC, Second Round, 13 February 2021).
Most goals in a game: 14, Cameron Morgan (for Albion Park White Eagles v. Epping FC, Second Round, 14 March 2020).

Winners and finalists

List of finals

Results by team 
Since its establishment, the Australia Cup has been won by 5 different teams, and 8 different teams have contested in the final.

Individual honours

Mark Viduka Medal

The award given to the player of the match in each year's FFA Cup Final.

Michael Cockerill Medal
Named after the late former journalist and broadcaster, the Michael Cockerill Medal recognizes the tournament's standout performer from a Member Federation Club.

Media coverage 
In the tournament's first season, 10 matches were broadcast live on Fox Sports. Internationally, several FFA Cup matches were broadcast live in South Asian nations, such as: Afghanistan, Bangladesh, Bhutan, India, Maldives, Nepal, Pakistan and Sri Lanka, after a three-season deal with TEN Sports in 2014.

In 2015 and 2016 Fox Sports streamed live all non-broadcast games via their online services.

From 2017 onwards, 5 FFA Cup matches (from quarter finals) were broadcast live by beIN Sports in Asia-Pacific nations, such as: Brunei, Hong Kong, Indonesia, Malaysia, Philippines, Singapore, and Thailand. 7 FFA Cup matches were broadcast live by BT Sport in the UK and Republic of Ireland.

From 2018, at least 1 FFA Cup match per round was scheduled to be broadcast live by ESPN+ in the United States and in other countries where the rights were not sold, most of the matches were streamed live by YouTube via My Football channel.

In 2017 the ABC held the Radio broadcast rights for FFA Cup matches, including the Final.

In 2021 Network 10 and Paramount+ obtained the TV broadcast rights for the next 5 years, starting from the round of 32 of the FFA Cup/Australia Cup all the way until the finals.

Current broadcasters

See also

List of Australian soccer champions – National Cup winners

Notes

References

External links
 Official website

Australia Cup
Recurring sporting events established in 2014
Soccer cup competitions in Australia
National association football cups
2014 establishments in Australia